Radyo Bandera 92.9 News FM (DXFK 92.9 MHz) is an FM station owned and operated by Bandera News Philippines. Its studios are located at Tacep St., Tagum, and its transmitter is located at Mawab.

References

External links
Radyo Bandera Davao Region FB Page

Radio stations in Davao del Norte
Radio stations established in 2019